Sageretia laxiflora is a 10m tall shrub.  The branchlets have yellow or white tomentose, while the older branches have stout spines.  It is found in thickets on slopes and grasslands up to 700 m in elevation.  It is located in W. Guangxi and S. Guizhou China.

References
RHAMNACEAE

laxiflora
Flora of China